Tim Wieskötter (born March 12, 1979, in Emsdetten, North Rhine-Westphalia) is a German sprint canoer who has competed since the late 1990s. Competing in three Summer Olympics, he won a complete set of medals in the K-2 500 m event (gold: 2004, silver: 2008, bronze: 2000) with Ronald Rauhe.

Since their initial pairing in 2000, they have completely dominated the event, winning the major race of the season every year which also includes six world championships (2001, 2002, 2003, 2005, 2006 and 2007). They have also won seven consecutive European gold medals. In addition, Rauhe and Wieskötter hold the K-2 500 m world record of 1:26.971 (Szeged, 2002).

In 2006 Rauhe and Wieskötter doubled up for the first time, defending their K-2 500 m titles and also adding the K-2 200 m gold medals at both the European and World Championships.

References

External links
Official website 

1979 births
Living people
People from Emsdetten
Sportspeople from Münster (region)
Canoeists at the 2000 Summer Olympics
Canoeists at the 2004 Summer Olympics
Canoeists at the 2008 Summer Olympics
Canoeists at the 2012 Summer Olympics
German male canoeists
Olympic canoeists of Germany
Olympic gold medalists for Germany
Olympic silver medalists for Germany
Olympic bronze medalists for Germany
Olympic medalists in canoeing
ICF Canoe Sprint World Championships medalists in kayak
Medalists at the 2008 Summer Olympics
Medalists at the 2004 Summer Olympics
Medalists at the 2000 Summer Olympics